ECTS may refer to:

 Elementary cognitive tasks, from psychometrics
 Engine coolant temperature sensor
 European Calcified Tissue Society
 European Computer Trade Show
 European Credit Transfer and Accumulation System, a higher education standard
 ECTS grading scale
 a misspelling of ETCS, the European Train Control System